Hanna Drabenia born 15 August 1987, Starobin, Minsk Region is a Belarusian race walker. She competed in the 20 km kilometres event at the 2012 Summer Olympics, finishing 25th with a time of 1:31:58.

She has raced at various major international competitions and was 24th in the women's 20-kilometer walk at the 2012 London Olympics and 16th at the world championships a year later. On 31 March 2016, Belarusian race walker Hanna Drabenia picked up a two-year ban following a failed test at a competition in Belarus in 2015.

References

1987 births
Living people
People from Salihorsk District
Belarusian female racewalkers
Olympic athletes of Belarus
Athletes (track and field) at the 2012 Summer Olympics
Doping cases in athletics
Belarusian sportspeople in doping cases
Athletes (track and field) at the 2020 Summer Olympics
Sportspeople from Minsk Region
Universiade medalists in athletics (track and field)
Universiade bronze medalists for Belarus